K2-24c also known as EPIC 203771098 c is an exoplanet orbiting the Sun-like star K2-24 every 42 days. It has a density far lower than that of Saturn, which indicates that the planet is clearly a gas giant.

References

Exoplanets discovered in 2015
Transiting exoplanets
Exoplanets discovered by K2

Scorpius (constellation)